Marissa Yardley Clifford is a British-American, visual artist and writer based in Los Angeles. Clifford was born in 1992 in Starkville, Mississippi however spent the majority of her youth in California's central coast. She attended UCLA where she studied Art History and Digital Humanities.

Visual art 
After school Clifford began work with Getty Research Institute's Digital Art History team, and served as project manager for the Getty Scholars' Workspace. Her work focuses on the intersection between arts, tech, and culture, primarily through video art, projection, and painting. Her collaboration DH4 with artist Victoria Wells was on display at The Getty and her projections have been featured at The Hammer. Clifford has also been active with the music scene and her projections have been featured alongside many bands and at music festivals.

Writing 
Clifford's writing career began in 2006, when she began writing for a local newspaper. Clifford's work has been featured in Motherboard, Broadly, and Vice, and The Culture Trip. She has published many articles for Curbed, and has appeared on local networks speaking about gentrification and the digital divide in MacArthur Park. She's also worked with major ad agencies including Media Arts Lab.

Film 
She also appeared as Clara, in the award-winning short film Tryouts (2012).

References

1992 births
Living people
American contemporary artists
University of California, Los Angeles alumni